The 1923 Wake Forest Baptists football team was an American football team that represented Wake Forest University during the 1923 college football season. In its first season under head coach Hank Garrity, the team compiled a 6–3 record. After a particularly impressive win against Trinity College (predecessor of Duke University), in the following issue of the school newspaper, the editor of the paper, Mayon Parker (1924 Wake Forest graduate), first referred to the team as "Demon Deacons," in recognition of what he called their "devilish" play and fighting spirit. Henry Belk, Wake Forest's news director, and Garrity liked the title and used it often, so the popularity of the term grew.

Schedule

References

Wake Forest
Wake Forest Demon Deacons football seasons
Wake Forest Baptists football